Anelson Vieira (born 19 February 1954) is a Brazilian judoka. He competed in the men's lightweight event at the 1980 Summer Olympics.

References

1954 births
Living people
Brazilian male judoka
Olympic judoka of Brazil
Judoka at the 1980 Summer Olympics
Sportspeople from Rio de Janeiro (city)